Delta Field can refer to 
 Delta Field (Niger Delta), an oil field in Nigeria
 Delta Field (Minneapolis), a defunct college baseball venue in Minneapolis, Minnesota
  McCool Stadium in Mississippi